State Highway 172 (SH 172) is a state highway in Texas that connects Ganado to Olivia on the Gulf Coast.

Route description
State maintenance and the SH 172 designation begin along the shore of Keller Bay in the Calhoun County community of Olivia. The route travels northward along the peninsula and into Jackson County, where it intersects  SH 35 in the hamlet of Weedhaven. SH 172 continues to the north and has a brief concurrency  FM 616 in La Ward before turning slightly to the northwest. It has a junction with  SH 111 before entering Ganado along 3rd Street. The SH 172 designation ends at  Loop 522, the former route of  US 59 through the city; 3rd Street continues northward as  FM 710.

History
SH 172 was originally designated on August 2, 1932 from Ganado to La Ward. On January 9, 1934, the route was extended to Olivia, replacing part of SH 111, which was rerouted further north.

Major intersections

References

172
Transportation in Calhoun County, Texas
Transportation in Jackson County, Texas